Gliese 876 e is an exoplanet orbiting the star Gliese 876 in the constellation of Aquarius. It is in a 1:2:4 Laplace resonance with the planets Gliese 876 c and Gliese 876 b: for each orbit of planet e, planet b completes two orbits and planet c completes four. This configuration is the second known example of a Laplace resonance after Jupiter's moons Io, Europa and Ganymede.  Its orbit takes 124 days to complete.

Gliese 876 e has a mass similar to that of the planet Uranus. Its orbit takes 124 days to complete, or roughly one third of a year. While the orbital period is longer than that of Mercury around the Sun, the lower mass of the host star relative to the Sun means the planet's orbit has a slightly smaller semimajor axis. Unlike Mercury, Gliese 876 e has a nearly circular orbit with an eccentricity of 0.055 ± 0.012.

This planet, like b and c, has likely migrated inward.

References

Gliese 876
Aquarius (constellation)
Exoplanets discovered in 2010
Exoplanets detected by radial velocity
Giant planets
8